Taylor Loffler (born February 25, 1992) is a former professional Canadian football safety. In the Canadian Football League (CFL)'s Amateur Scouting Bureau final rankings, he was ranked as the 11th best of the players eligible in the 2016 CFL Draft. He was then drafted in the third round, 19th overall, by the Winnipeg Blue Bombers and signed with the team on May 18, 2016. He was the Blue Bombers' nominee for most outstanding rookie in 2016. He played NCAA football for the Boise State Broncos from 2011 to 2014, although due to injuries, he only dressed for games in the 2013 season. He then transferred to the University of British Columbia and played Canadian Interuniversity Sport (CIS) football with the UBC Thunderbirds in 2015. He announced his retirement from football on June 23, 2021.

Statistics

References

External links
Winnipeg Blue Bombers bio

1992 births
Living people
Canadian football defensive backs
Sportspeople from Kelowna
Winnipeg Blue Bombers players
Players of Canadian football from British Columbia
Montreal Alouettes players